The Battle of Ringmere  was fought on 5 May 1010. Norse sagas recorded a battle at Hringmaraheiðr; Old English Hringmere-hǣð, modern name Ringmere Heath.

In his Víkingarvísur, the poet Sigvat records the victory of Saint Olaf (who according to Norse sources was fighting together with King Ethelred) over Ulfcytel Snillingr:

 Yet again Óláfr caused a sword-assembly [BATTLE] to be held for the seventh time in Ulfcytel’s land, as I recount the tale. The offspring of Ælla [= Englishmen] stood over all Ringmere Heath; there was slaying of the army there, where the guardian of Haraldr’s inheritance [= Óláfr] caused exertion.

John of Worcester records that the Danes defeated the Saxons. Over a three-month period the Danes wasted East Anglia, burning Thetford and Cambridge.

References

Ringmere 1010
Ringmere 1010
Ringmere
Ringmere 1010
Ringmere
1004 in England
1010 in England